Litten's sign is a clinical sign in which cotton wool spots are seen on fundoscopic examination of the retina in patients with infective endocarditis.

The sign is named after Moritz Litten.

See also 
 Roth's spot

References 

Medical signs
Cardiology